The Yaeyama Islands (八重山列島 Yaeyama-rettō, also 八重山諸島 Yaeyama-shotō, Yaeyama: Yaima, Yonaguni: Daama, Okinawan: Yeema, Northern Ryukyuan:  Yapema) are an archipelago in the southwest of Okinawa Prefecture, Japan, and cover . The islands are located southwest of the Miyako Islands, part of the Ryukyu Islands archipelago. The Yaeyama Islands are the remotest part of Japan from the main islands and contain Japan's most southern (Hateruma) and most western (Yonaguni) inhabited islands. The city of Ishigaki serves as the political, cultural, and economic center of the Yaeyama Islands.

Natural history
The Yaeyama Islands are home to numerous species of subtropical and tropical plants, and mangrove forests. The islands produce sugarcane and pineapples. Coral reefs around the islands are ideal habitats for dolphins, sea turtles, and larger fish such as manta rays and whale sharks. Before being wiped out by humans, whales and dugongs were common as well, and Yaeyama once had the largest population of dugongs in the Ryukyu Islands. On Aragusuku Island, there is a Utaki which specially enshrines hunted dugongs with their skulls, but non-residents are not permitted to enter unless they receive special permission from inhabitants, and it is said that any aliens without permission will be driven out by force. The islands have been recognised as an Important Bird Area (IBA) by BirdLife International because they support populations of resident Japanese wood pigeons and Ryukyu green pigeons, wintering ruddy turnstones, migrating grey-tailed tattlers, and breeding colonies of bridled, roseate and black-naped terns.

Satakentia liukiuensis, the only species in the genus Satakentia, is a palm tree that is endemic to the two islands of Ishigaki and Iriomote in the Yaeyama Islands.

Geography
The islands form the southern part of the volcanic Ryukyu Islands.  The administrative division of Yaeyama District covers all of the Yaeyama Islands, except Ishigaki and the disputed Senkaku Islands.

Inhabited islands
Source:

  Ishigaki City
 Ishigaki Island (Ishigaki-jima)
  Taketomi Town (Yaeyama District)
 Aragusuku Island (Aragusuku-jima)
 Hateruma Island (Hateruma-jima)
 Iriomote Island (Iriomote-jima)
 Kayama Island (Kayama-jima)
 Kohama Island (Kohama-jima)
 Kuroshima Island (Kuroshima)
 Sotobanari Island (Sotobanari-jima) (officially uninhabited)
 Taketomi Island (Taketomi-jima)
 Yubu Island (Yubu-jima)
 Hatoma Island (Hatoma-jima)
  Yonaguni Town (Yaeyama District)
 Yonaguni Island (Yonaguni-jima)

Culture
The Yonaguni language is the indigenous language of the island of Yonaguni. The Yaeyama language is the indigenous language of the rest of the islands. Japanese is now the native language of most of the population.

The Yaeyama Islands are home to the production of traditional Okinawan textiles.

Mushaama Festival
14 July: Mushaama Festival.  On Hateruma Island, this harvest festival is celebrated during Obon.  It features a parade of the local fertility god Miruku and his children (the local children), shishi ("lion") dances, and staff dances.

References

External links

 Photo gallery of Yaeyama Islands

 
Archipelagoes of Japan
Archipelagoes of the Pacific Ocean
Important Bird Areas of the Nansei Islands
Islands of Okinawa Prefecture
Ryukyu Islands
Sakishima Islands